4722 Agelaos  is a Jupiter trojan from the Trojan camp, approximately  in diameter. It was discovered during the third Palomar–Leiden Trojan survey at the Palomar Observatory in California in 1977. The Jovian asteroid has a rotation period of 18.4 hours and belongs to the 90 largest Jupiter trojans. It was named after Agelaus from Greek mythology.

Discovery 

Agelaos was discovered on 16 October 1977, by Dutch astronomer couple Ingrid and Cornelis van Houten at Leiden, on photographic plates taken by Dutch–American astronomer Tom Gehrels at the Palomar Observatory in California. The body's observation arc begins with its first observations at Palomar on 7 October 1977, just nine day prior to its official discovery observation.

Palomar–Leiden survey 

The survey designation "T-3" stands for the third Palomar–Leiden Trojan survey, named after the fruitful collaboration of the Palomar and Leiden Observatory in the 1960s and 1970s. Gehrels used Palomar's Samuel Oschin telescope (also known as the 48-inch Schmidt Telescope), and shipped the photographic plates to Ingrid and Cornelis van Houten at Leiden Observatory where astrometry was carried out. The trio are credited with the discovery of several thousand asteroid discoveries.

Orbit and classification 

Agelaos is a dark Jovian asteroid in a 1:1 orbital resonance with Jupiter. It is located in the trailering Trojan camp at the Gas Giant's  Lagrangian point, 60° behind its orbit . It is also a non-family asteroid of the Jovian background population.

It orbits the Sun at a distance of 4.6–5.8 AU once every 11 years and 11 months (4,341 days; semi-major axis of 5.21 AU). Its orbit has an eccentricity of 0.11 and an inclination of 9° with respect to the ecliptic.

Physical characteristics 

Agelaos is an assumed, carbonaceous C-type asteroid. It has a V–I color index of 0.91, typical for most Jovian D-type asteroids, the dominant spectral type among the larger Jupiter trojans.

Rotation period 

In December 2002, a first rotational lightcurve of Agelaos was obtained from photometric observations over two consecutive nights by Italian astronomer Stefano Mottola with the 1.2-meter telescope at Calar Alto Observatory in Spain. Lightcurve analysis gave a rotation period of 18.61 hours with a brightness amplitude of 0.23 magnitude. Observations in the R-band by astronomers at the Palomar Transient Factory in October 2012 gave a period of 18.456 hours with an amplitude of 0.15 magnitude.

Diameter and albedo 

According to the surveys carried out by the NEOWISE mission of NASA's Wide-field Infrared Survey Explorer and the Japanese Akari satellite, Agelaos measures 50.38 and 59.47 kilometers in diameter and its surface has an albedo of 0.076 and 0.067, respectively. The Collaborative Asteroid Lightcurve Link assumes a standard albedo for a carbonaceous asteroid of 0.057 and calculates a diameter of 53.16 kilometers based on an absolute magnitude of 10.1.

Naming 

This minor planet was named from Greek mythology after the shepherd Agelaus, who was ordered by King Priam to expose the Trojan prince Paris as an infant – because the prophecy predicted that he would cause the destruction of Troy– but brought him up as his own son instead. The official naming citation was published by the Minor Planet Center on 28 May 1991.

Notes

References

External links 
 Asteroid Lightcurve Database (LCDB), query form (info )
 Dictionary of Minor Planet Names, Google books
 Discovery Circumstances: Numbered Minor Planets (1)-(5000) – Minor Planet Center
 Asteroid 4722 Agelaos at the Small Bodies Data Ferret
 
 

004722
Discoveries by Cornelis Johannes van Houten
Discoveries by Ingrid van Houten-Groeneveld
Discoveries by Tom Gehrels
4271
Named minor planets
19771016